Several attacks in Western Russia, primarily in the Bryansk, Kursk, and Belgorod oblasts, have been reported since the start of the Russian invasion of Ukraine, which began on 24 February 2022. Russia has been accusing Ukraine of responsibility. According to The Moscow Times, "Ukraine has not claimed responsibility for the attacks ... while not formally denying being behind them."

Attacks

February 2022 
On 24 February, during the first day of the Russian invasion of Ukraine, it was reported that a border checkpoint in Tyotkino in Kursk Oblast was attacked from Ukraine at 9:40. There were no injuries and it was claimed the attack was stopped by the response of Russian border guards, who retaliated.

On 25 February, the Millerovo air base was attacked, allegedly with Tochka-U missiles, presumedly by the Ukrainian 19th Missile Brigade.

March 2022 
On 1 March, there was an explosion on a military air base in Taganrog in Rostov Oblast, Russia. There were claims it was effectuated by Ukraine.

On 23 and 24 March, Governor of Belgorod Oblast Vyacheslav Gladkov reported that Zhuravlyovka and Nekhoteyevka came under shelling from the Ukrainian side. The next day, the Moscow Patriarchate claimed that chaplain  died in Zhuravlyovka as a result of a BM-30 Smerch strike by Ukraine.

On 29 March, local officials reported a series of explosions outside the Russian city of Belgorod, close to the border with Ukraine. It was later reported that those explosions may have been caused by a fire.

April 2022 
On 1 April, according to Russian governor Vyacheslav Gladkov and an unnamed US official, two Ukrainian Mi-24 Helicopters attacked and set fire to a fuel depot in Belgorod, Russia in a low-altitude airstrike with no reported casualties. Ukraine denied and dismissed this event on Russian territory as Russian propaganda. Ukrainian security official Oleksiy Danilov denied Ukraine was behind the helicopter attack, with a joke in which he blamed the "People's Republic of Belgorod" instead. On the same day, a rocket exploded in a different part of the Russian oblast, but its apparent trajectory and model led open-source researchers to suspect it was a failed Russian missile.

On 11 April, Belgorod, Bryansk, Kursk, and Voronezh Oblasts all raised their terror alert system to "yellow", the second tier in a three-class system. The Republic of Crimea and Krasnodar Krai did not raise their alert levels except in certain districts. Authorities in Belgorod ordered a two-week ban on fireworks and firecrackers.

On 14 April, the FSB border service reported that on 13 April, a border checkpoint near Novye Yurkovichi in Bryansk Oblast came under mortar fire from Ukraine while a group of around 30 Ukrainian refugees headed for Russia was present there. According to the official claims, two automobiles were damaged but no injuries were documented.

On the same day, regional and municipal authorities stated that Ukraine had shelled the village of Spodaryushino (near Mokraya Orlovka) in Belgorod Oblast, causing several explosions. While no injuries occurred, the village's population was temporarily evacuated, out of concerns about a possible escalation. A neighboring settlement also had its population relocated. Governor of Belgorod Oblast Vyacheslav Gladkov said that the attack "had come from the Ukrainian side." In a separate alleged attack a resident of Zhuravlyovka was injured, according to Gladkov.

On the same day, the Investigative Committee of Russia said Ukrainian attack helicopters had launched six missile strikes on residential areas in the town of Klimovo in Bryansk Oblast, damaging six buildings. Officials at the Russian Health Ministry said that seven people had been injured, two of which had been hurt seriously. According to personnel at the city's hospital, among those injured were a pregnant woman and a two-year-old child. According to Radio Free Europe/Radio Liberty, an unverified video of a house in Bryansk burning went viral on the internet.  The next day, Russian security services claimed they had shot down a Mil Mi-8 helicopter during the incident.

On 19 April, Belgorod's governor accused Ukrainian forces of striking the village of Golovchino, damaging more than 30 houses and lightly wounding 3 residents.

On 24 April, Russian state media agency TASS reported a village in Belgorod Oblast had been shelled with a projectile launched from Ukraine's direction.

On 25 April, according to the Belgorod governor, at least two residents, a man and a woman, were injured in Zhuravlyovka as a result of shelling.

On the same day, another attack happened in Bryansk: in the morning, two large explosions and fires occurred at two oil facilities, a civilian one and a military one. Videos and images posted on social media showed large columns of black smoke several hours after the initial explosions. An analyst told The Guardian that the fires were likely an act of sabotage by Ukraine, although responsibility remained uncertain. Unconfirmed reports in the Russian media suggested the fires could have been caused by a drone attack; on the same day, two Bayraktar TB2 drones were reportedly shot down in Bryansk Oblast.

On 29–30 April, a border checkpoint near Krupets in the Rylsky District in Kursk Oblast was repeatedly shelled, according to the governor. The Bryansk governor said that his region was shelled as well.

May 2022 
On 11 May, the Belgorod governor claimed that Solokhi was shelled from the side of Ukraine. According to his statements, one person was killed and seven were injured as a result of the incident. Videos online also showed damage to stores and private houses, local officials reportedly began evacuating the village after the attack. The deceased was identified as Ruslan Nefyodov, aged 18.

On 15 May, Gladkov said that one person was injured with a shrapnel wound in  after a Ukrainian strike, as 10 shells were reportedly shot down by Russian air defense systems.

On 17 May, he claimed that one more person was slightly injured in Bezymeno as it was shelled from the territory of Ukraine. Kursk governor said that the border checkpoint at Tyotkino had been shelled once again on the same day, no victims were reported. On 18 May, Gladkov declared that Solokhi was shelled again, and one person was reportedly injured. Kursk governor Starovoyt reported that , was shelled.

On 19 May, Starovoyt claimed that a distillery in Tyotkino was shelled, a truck driver died, and at least one civilian was wounded.

On 25 May, Gladkov claimed that one person was wounded in Zhuravlyovka as it was shelled "from the territory of Ukraine".

Zhuravlyovka and Nekhoteyevka were subject to continuous shelling on 26 May. A woman died from her wounds in the hospital the next day.

On 26 May, Starovoyt said that  came under shelling "from the Ukrainian side", and a local school teacher was wounded by broken glass.

June 2022 
On 6 June, a bridge at Tyotkino was shelled, damaging it. Near the bridge, a block of apartments was badly damaged, a car was burnt out and the local sugar refinery suffered some damage.

Klintsy and its surrounding regions in Bryansk Oblast were shelled for three days straight beginning on 12 June. The first two days of attacks were more minor incidents targeting military bases, with little to no casualties. On 14 June a helicopter fired missiles at residential areas in the city, damaging dozens of houses and ripping a woman's leg off. Authorities recorded six injuries on 14 June. As a result of the attacks, Klintsy and the surrounding region was left without water and electricity.

On 22 June, the Novoshakhtinsk oil refinery in the Rostov Oblast was reportedly hit by a suicide drone, no casualties were reported.

Haaretz described the bombing of Russian villages on the Ukrainian border as "constant" and attributed them to the Ukrainian army fire.

July 2022 
On 3 July, Russian officials said that a group of explosions targeting civilian areas in Belgorod had killed at least five people and injured four, several buildings and private houses were damaged or destroyed, anti-aircraft defense systems reportedly activated, but one projectile hit an apartment building. Russia blamed Ukraine for the attack and Defence Ministry spokesman Igor Konashenkov said that Russia had shot down three Ukrainian Tochka U ballistic missiles armed with cluster warheads. Ukraine denied it was responsible.

August 2022 
On 20 August, journalist, political scientist and activist Darya Dugina was killed by a car bombing in Bolshiye Vyazyomy, Odintsovsky District, Moscow Oblast.

September 2022 
A civilian was killed and two hospitalized after shelling hit the town of Valuyki in Belgorod Oblast on 15 September, according to regional authorities. Earlier, Russian authorities had reported that a border checkpoint on Nekhoteevka was attacked and that the customs terminal had caught on fire.

October 2022 
On 11 October, an explosion was reported at an electric substation in Shebekino, some residents were left without energy as a result of this event.

On 15 October, new explosions were reported in Belgorod, an oil depot reportedly caught on fire.

On 16 October, explosions were reported at an airport in Belgorod, videos online show anti-aircraft systems firing and smoke rising on the airport after an apparent missile strike, 2 people were reportedly wounded.

November 2022 
On 1 November, the settlement of Krasnooktyabrsky in Glushkovo district was reportedly shelled by Ukrainian forces, no injuries were reported, a five-story building was damaged and several windows were blown; Another attack was also reported in Kozynka, one person was reportedly wounded in the shelling.

On 2 November, 5 civilians, including 3 children, were reportedly injured after shells hit the village of Guyevo, Sudzha district. Several private houses and stores were also damaged in the attack, the village was also left without electricity as power lines were either destroyed or damaged following the explosions.

On 15 November, 2 civilians were killed and 3 injured after shelling in the Russian village of Shebekino, Belgorod Oblast, the shells reportedly hit apartment buildings and a pharmacy nearby. Later, the governor of Belgorod said that an 80-year-old woman died of her wounds in the hospital and that a man was killed and another was injured by parts of a missile that was shot down by air defense.

On 16 November, in the village of Stalnoy Kon, Oryol Oblast, an unmanned aerial vehicle reportedly attacked an oil depot, and no casualties were reported. Earlier that month, on 14 November, Russian media had also reported several blasts in the Belgorod region.

December 2022 

On 5 December, two Russian airbases reported explosions, allegedly caused by Ukrainian drone attacks. At Engels-2 air base in Saratov Oblast, 2 Tu-95s were reportedly damaged. At Dyagilevo air base in Ryazan Oblast, an oil truck exploded, killing three soldiers and injuring four.

On 6 December, Governor of Kursk Oblast Roman Starovoy announced that in the morning, an oil reservoir near the Kursk-Khalino airbase caught on fire as a result of a drone attack; no casualties were reported and the fire was quickly put out.

On 17 December, explosions were reported in Belgorod, a local resident's car was reportedly damaged by a fragment of ammunition debris.

On 18 December, explosions were reported again in Belgorod, Russian officials claimed that they were the result of anti-aircraft fire; several cars and houses were damaged by debris, 4 people were wounded in the city itself, and 1 person was killed in the suburbs, local Telegram channels also posted images showing thick black smoke rising over the city.

More explosions were reported elsewhere in the Belgorod Oblast, a poultry farm was reportedly hit; 2 people, including 1 employee of the farm, died as a result of the explosions, 3 other employees were also wounded during the alleged attack, local Telegram channels showed videos allegedly showing the aftermath of the attack.

On 25 December, three Russian soldiers were killed in another attack on Engels air base.

February 2023 
On 11 February, the Governor of the Belgorod Oblast reported that Ukrainian grad missiles had hit the city of Shebekino, as a result of the attack, 3 men were wounded and an industrial enterprise was damaged, the missiles destroyed one building of the enterprise and damaged a bus stop, as well as 3 private cars; another attack with grad rockets was reported later, local authorities claimed that the missiles hit 2 private houses, 1 of which caught on fire as result of the strike.

On 22 February, regional authorities reported that two people had been injured by shelling in Shebekino, Belgorod Oblast, and that three houses were damaged from shelling in Pervoye Tseplyayevo. 

On February 28, an Rosneft oil depot in Tuapse, Krasnodar Krai, caught on fire after an alleged drone attack, locals reported several explosions in the depot, which local officials blamed on 2 drones that allegedly crashed into the terminal and exploded, the boiler room was reportedly damaged, although the local government denied any damage to the facility's oil tanks; there was no victims, and the fire was quickly extinguished. On the same day, an FSB border service observation tower was damaged by an UAV, allegedly from Ukraine.

March 2023

Reaction

Russian response
Schools in Bryansk Oblast were closed following the attack on 14 April and four regions in Russia increased their security measures. In response to alleged shelling by Ukraine, Russia reportedly began reinforcing its border with Ukraine, including building defense lines and fortifications along the border of the Belgorod, Kursk and Bryansk Oblasts with Ukraine. A state of emergency was also declared on some villages and settlements along the border with Ukraine following repeated shelling attacks.

On 15 April, Russia launched major missile strikes on the Ukrainian capital of Kyiv in retaliation for the attacks. The Russian attacks were the largest of their kind to take place since Russia aborted its offensive into Kyiv Oblast. After the 5 December missile strikes, Russian forces launched a new wave of attack against Ukrainian cities. A missile reportedly fell on Moldova as a result of the attack.

ISW reported that Russian forces could be preparing a large-scale false flag attack to gather popular support for the invasion, with Kremlin propagandists claiming that Ukraine is "preparing to invade" Belgorod Oblast. A senior Ukrainian officer later said that Russia may attempt to escalate the situation on the border and claim "NATO and Ukrainian aggression", he cited recent fake news being spread in pro-Russian Telegram channels about "Ukrainian and NATO plans" to "Attack peaceful Russian and Belarusian territory", as well as recent construction of border defenses along Russian Oblasts bordering Ukraine, the Ukrainian General Staff also claimed that Russia could attempt to force Belarus into the war, and that "10-15 thousand Belarusian forces" were already on the border with Ukraine, citing reports of possible Reconnaissance missions conducted by Belarusian forces.

Ukrainian response
Ukraine rejected the claims that it was responsible for the 14 April attacks, instead asserting that Russian intelligence services were trying to "carry out terrorist acts to whip up anti-Ukrainian hysteria" in the country.

After the attack, the Security Service of Ukraine released what it claimed were intercepted conversations between Russian soldiers showing that Russia deliberately fired on the villages in order to blame Ukraine. One of the alleged soldiers refers to the Russian apartment bombings in 1999 where he says that the "same shit happened in the Chechen war. Apartments were blown up in Moscow, like they were terrorists. In fact, they are FSB officers."

In response to accusations regarding the 13 April Bryansk border checkpoint incident by Russia's FSB security service, Ukrainian interior ministry advisor Anton Herashchenko said that something "fell and caught fire" at a Russian military facility, without explicitly confirming or denying Ukrainian responsibility.

On 27 April, Mykhailo Podolyak, advisor to Volodymyr Zelenskyy, commented on the recent incidents. Without directly admitting that Ukraine was responsible, he said that it was not possible to "sit out" the Russian invasion.

See also
 Shelling of Donetsk, Russia
 2022 rail war in Belarus
 2022–2023 Russian mystery fires

Notes

References

Further reading
 Victor Davidoff, "Why Is the Kremlin Silent About Attacks on Russian Territory?", Eurasia Daily Monitor, v 19, n 75, 23 May 2022.

2022 controversies
2022 fires in Europe
Events affected by the 2022 Russian invasion of Ukraine
Fires in Russia
History of Belgorod Oblast
History of Kursk Oblast
History of Rostov Oblast
History of Bryansk Oblast
2022 in Russia
Attacks in 2022
History of Voronezh Oblast